The 1903 Northwestern Purple team represented Northwestern University during the 1903 college football season. The Wildcats compiled a 10–1–3 record and outscored their opponents by a combined total of 229 to 67.

Schedule

References

Northwestern
Northwestern Wildcats football seasons
Big Ten Conference football champion seasons
Northwestern Purple football